Deoxyribodipyrimidine endonucleosidase (pyrimidine dimer DNA-glycosylase, endonuclease V, deoxyribonucleate pyrimidine dimer glycosidase, pyrimidine dimer DNA glycosylase, T4-induced UV endonuclease, PD-DNA glycosylase) is an enzyme with systematic name deoxy-D-ribocyclobutadipyrimidine polynucleotidodeoxyribohydrolase. This enzyme catalyses the following chemical reaction

 Cleaves the N-glycosidic bond between the 5'-pyrimidine residue in cyclobutadipyrimidine (in DNA) and the corresponding deoxy-D-ribose residue

The only family of enzymes known to have this activity is represented by a phage T4 protein. This family also has AP lyase activity against the AP site produced by this reaction.

References

External links 
 

EC 3.2.2